Josef Hendrych is a retired Czechoslovak slalom canoeist who competed in the 1950s and the 1960s. He won seven medals at the ICF Canoe Slalom World Championships with two golds (C-2 team: 1955, 1957), four silvers (C-2: 1957, 1959; C-2 team: 1959, 1961) and a bronze (C-2 team: 1953).

References

Czechoslovak male canoeists
Possibly living people
Year of birth missing (living people)
Medalists at the ICF Canoe Slalom World Championships